Rocheva is a rural locality (a village) in Oshibskoye Rural Settlement, Kudymkarsky District, Perm Krai, Russia. The population was 101 in 2010. There are three streets.

Geography 
Rocheva is located 32 km northeast of Kudymkar (the district's administrative centre) by road. Oshib is the nearest rural locality.

References 

Rural localities in Kudymkarsky District